The United Liberal Democrats (ULD) was a right-wing conservative political party in South Korea, whose support mostly came from the North Chungcheong and South Chungcheong regions. The short Korean name is Jaminryeon (ULD).

The Party was in a government coalition with Kim Dae-jung's Democratic Party from 1998 to 2001.

In the 2004 parliamentary election, it gained only 4 seats in the National Assembly, and its president Kim Jong-pil announced his retirement from politics after his bid for the 10th term in the National Assembly failed. Subsequently, most lawmakers from the party chose to defect from the party to form a new party, People First Party. Kim Hak-won, the only remaining lawmaker of the party who was also the president of the party then, announced the merger of the party with the main opposition Grand National Party on February 20, 2006.

Election results

Legislature

Local

References

External links
United Liberal Democrats official site (in English)

1995 establishments in South Korea
2006 disestablishments in South Korea
Conservative parties in South Korea
Defunct political parties in South Korea
National conservative parties
Liberty Korea Party
Political parties disestablished in 2006
Political parties established in 1997
Social conservative parties